Between Earth and Sky is the second album by Rhea's Obsession. The album features styles of music including gothic rock and darkwave.

Track listing

References

Rhea's Obsession albums
2001 albums